The Cyprus National Paralympic Committee is the National Paralympic Committee in Cyprus for the Paralympic Games movement. It is a non-profit organisation that selects teams, and raises funds to send Cypriot competitors to Paralympic events organised by the International Paralympic Committee (IPC).

See also
Cyprus at the Paralympics

References

External links
Official website

National Paralympic Committees
Paralympic
Cyprus at the Paralympics
Sports organizations established in 1999
1999 establishments in Cyprus